Next Day Air is the sixth official mixtape from Milwaukee, Wisconsin group Streetz-n-Young Deuces. The mixtape was released on March 20, 2012, through EMP Entertainment. The mixtape's lead single, "Treadmill," was produced by Shotgun Shorty. The second single, "Cadillac Muzik," was produced by Jae Swaggs.

Background
Streetz-n-Young Deuces began working on the mixtape immediately after Straight Drop Muzik. The project took nearly a full year to be produced. The mixtape was named for the film Next Day Air, but the two are unrelated.

Track listing

Singles
The mixtape's first single was "Treadmill." A music video was shot and released through the RubyHornet.com website on April 30, 2012. The video was filmed, directed and edited by DADO Productions.

Song notes
 The song "The Struggle" is a remake of the song they put out in 2008 featuring Geolani.
 The song "Place Me" which features Mickey Factz was noted as Streetz-n-Young Deuces' first XXL Magazine appearance.

References

2012 mixtape albums
Streetz-n-Young Deuces albums